Saint-Sixt is a commune in the Haute-Savoie department in the Auvergne-Rhône-Alpes region in Southeastern France. It is located just east of La Roche-sur-Foron, to the north of the Bornes Massif. In 2019, it had a population of 1,018.

See also
Communes of the Haute-Savoie department

References

Communes of Haute-Savoie